The 1999 New York City Marathon was the 30th running of the annual marathon race in New York City, United States, which took place on Sunday, November 7. The men's elite race was won by Kenya's Joseph Chebet in a time of 2:09:14 hours while the women's race was won by Mexico's Adriana Fernández in 2:25:06.
      
A total of 31,786 runners finished the race, 22,626 men and 9160 women.

Results

Men

Women

References

Results
Results. Association of Road Racing Statisticians. Retrieved 2020-05-21.

External links
New York Road Runners website

1999
New York City
Marathon
New York City Marathon